Yuri Alexandrovich Bezmenov (December 11, 1939 – January 5, 1993; alias: Tomas David Schuman) was a Soviet journalist for Novosti Press Agency (APN) and a former PGU KGB informant who defected to Canada.

After being assigned to a station in India, Bezmenov eventually grew to love the people and the culture of India. At the same time, he began to resent the KGB-sanctioned repression of intellectuals who dissented from Moscow's policies and he decided to defect to the West. Bezmenov is best remembered for his anti-communist lectures and books published in the 1960s, 1970s, and 1980s.

Early life and student years (1939–1963) 
Bezmenov was born in 1939 in Mytishchi, near Moscow, to Russian parents. His father was a high ranking Soviet Army officer, later put in charge of inspecting Soviet troops in foreign countries, such as Mongolia and Cuba. Bezmenov's father died in the 1970s. When Bezmenov was seventeen, he entered the Institute of Oriental Languages, a part of the Moscow State University which was under the direct control of the KGB and the Communist Party Central Committee. In addition to languages, he studied history, literature, and music, and became an expert on Indian culture. During his second year, Bezmenov sought to look like a person from India; his teachers encouraged this because graduates of the school were employed as diplomats, foreign journalists, or spies.

As a Soviet student, he was required to take compulsory military training in which he was taught how to play "strategic war games" using the maps of foreign countries, as well as how to interrogate prisoners of war.

Life in India, propaganda work, and disillusionment (1963–1970)
After graduating in 1963, Bezmenov spent two years in India working as a translator and public relations officer with the Soviet economic aid group Soviet Refineries Constructions, which built refinery complexes.

In 1965, Bezmenov was recalled to Moscow and began to work for Novosti Press Agency as an apprentice for their classified department of "Political Publications" (GRPP). He discovered that about three quarters of Novosti's staffers were actually KGB officers, with the remainder being "co-optees" or KGB freelance writers and informers like himself. However, Bezmenov did not do real freelance writing. Instead, Bezmenov edited and planted propaganda materials in foreign media and accompanied delegations of Novosti's guests from foreign countries on tours of the Soviet Union or to international conferences held in the Soviet Union.

After several months, Bezmenov claimed he was forced to act as an informer while maintaining his position as a Novosti journalist. He used his journalistic duties to help gather information and to spread disinformation to foreign countries for the purposes of Soviet propaganda and subversion.

Rapid promotion followed, and Bezmenov was once again assigned to Bila in 1969, this time as a Soviet press-officer and a public relations agent for the KGB. He continued Novosti's propaganda efforts in New Delhi, working out of the Soviet embassy. Bezmenov was directed to slowly establish the Soviet sphere of influence in India. In the same year, a secret directive of the Central Committee opened a new secret department in all embassies of the Soviet Union around the world, titled the "Research and Counter-Propaganda Group". Bezmenov became a deputy chief of that department, which gathered intelligence from sources like Indian informers and agents, on influential or politically significant citizens of India.

Bezmenov stated that he was instructed not to waste time with idealistic leftists, as these would become disillusioned, bitter, and adversarial when they realized the true nature of Soviet communism.

During that period, increasingly seeing the Soviet system as insidious and ruthless, Bezmenov began careful planning to defect to the West.

Defection to the West and life in Canada (1970–1983)
According to a statement provided to the Delhi Police by the so-called Russian Information Centre, on February 8, 1970, Bezmenov was set to see a screening of the American film The Incident with two of his colleagues. However, it was reported by them at the time that he had not bought his ticket, and told them he would join them in a moment and try to purchase one from a scalper outside the theater. Bezmenov did not return to the theater. Instead, Bezmenov put on hippie clothes, complete with a beard and wig, before joining a tour group. By these means, he escaped to Athens, Greece. His defection was reported in the United States, with Soviet sources stating he was "not important" and did "clerical work", and American intelligence openly stating they believed him to be an agent of the KGB. At the time, his whereabouts were depicted in American media as unknown. After contacting the American embassy and undergoing extensive interviews with United States intelligence, the Central Intelligence Agency (CIA) was able to help Bezmenov seek asylum in Canada, granted by the administration of Pierre Trudeau. The CIA and the Royal Canadian Mounted Police (RCMP) advised him to adopt a new name and identity for reasons of safety. In order to save face with the embarrassment of a defection within the KGB ranks, the Delhi residency officially reported he had been abducted, and his son, his closest surviving relative, was given financial compensation.

After studying political science at the University of Toronto for two years, and working on an Ontario farm for three years, in 1973, Bezmenov was hired by the Canadian Broadcasting Corporation in Montreal, broadcasting to the Soviet Union as part of the CBC's International Service. This is when he met his wife, Tess. In 1976, Bezmenov was fired from the CBC at the request of then Prime Minister, Pierre Elliot Trudeau. The Soviet ambassador to Canada phoned then-prime minister Pierre Elliot Trudeau to complain about Bezmenov’s Russian-language broadcasts. This led to a phone call from the prime minister to CBC’s president and on down the chain until Bezmenov was fired on March 9, 1976. After the CBC, he began free-lance journalism. He became a consultant for Almanac Panorama of the World Information Network. Bezmenov claimed that the KGB successfully used the Soviet Ambassador to Canada to persuade Canadian Prime Minister Pierre Trudeau to apply pressure to have him removed from that position. He claimed that he received veiled death threats from the KGB.

Pro-American literature and lectures (Los Angeles, 1981–1986) 
He moved to Los Angeles in the 1980s. In 1983, at a lecture in Los Angeles, Bezmenov expressed the opinion that he "wouldn't be surprised" if the Soviet Union had shot down Korean Air Lines Flight 007 in order to kill Larry McDonald, an anti-communist Democratic member of the United States House of Representatives. Around the same time, Bezmenov had a child in the West, a daughter named Tanya. He later had a son named Johnathan.

In 1984, he gave an interview to G. Edward Griffin, titled 'Soviet Subversion of the Free World Press'. In the interview, Bezmenov explained the methods used by the KGB for the gradual subversion of the political system of the United States.The main emphasis of the KGB is not in the area of intelligence at all. Only about 15% of time, money, and manpower is spent on espionage and such. The other 85% is a slow process which we call either ideological subversion or active measures ... or psychological warfare.Under the pen-name, Tomas D. Schuman, Bezmenov authored the book Love Letter to America. The author's biography of the book likens Bezmenov to Winston Smith, from George Orwell's Nineteen Eighty-Four. Other books by Bezmenov are: No Novosti Is Good News, World Thought Police, Black Is Beautiful, Communism Is Not.

In 1984, the Washington Post reported Bezmenov publicly denounced admission of a Soviet cruise ship to Los Angeles during the 1984 Summer Olympics, stating that they were placed there under the guise of entertainment, but maintained electronic surveillance equipment aboard to monitor radio and telephone communications. In another interview, Bezmenov would describe a series of methods he posited that the KGB had used during the Games, including espionage by Soviet foreign journalists, as well as the use of other personnel to "provide better control against possible athletic defections."

Later years and death (1986–1993)
In 1989, he and his wife divorced. That same year he moved to Windsor, Ontario, while she stayed in Montreal. Two years later, he began teaching international relations at the University of Windsor. In late December 1992, Bezmenov visited Tess and their children in Montreal for Christmas. Two weeks later, Bezmenov's death was reported on January 6, 1993. According to the Windsor Star, he died of a "massive heart attack", on Tuesday, January 5, 1993.

Legacy
Since his death, Bezmenov's "Soviet subversion model" has been studied and interpreted by faculty and staff at the Joint Special Operations University (JSOU) to analyze historical events, including the decade-long Russian campaign that preceded the 2008 Russo-Georgian War. His work has also been cited by senior director of UPenn's Penn Biden Center for Diplomacy and Global Engagement, and former Deputy Assistant Secretary of Defense, Dr. Michael Carpenter. His lectures have also been used by Yale senior lecturer Asha Rangappa, to illustrate the concept of active measures in Russia's historical disinformation campaigns in the United States.

On August 19, 2020, Bezmenov's 1984 interview discussing active measures with a journalist G. Edward Griffin was used in the teaser for the video game Call of Duty: Black Ops Cold War, in addition to its use in the main introduction on August 26. This in part has contributed to a renewed interest in both Bezmenov's work and lectures.

Works

Books
 Love Letter to America. Los Angeles, Calif.: W.I.N. Almanac Panorama (1984). . .
 Black is Beautiful, Communism is Not. Los Angeles, Calif.: N.A.T.A. Almanac (1985). . .
"The following excerpts are from a talk on disinformation in the liberal media, given March 26 at a CAUSA USA Regional Conference in Atlanta, Georgia."
 No "Novosti" is Good News. Los Angeles, Calif.: Almanac (1985). . .
World Thought Police. Los Angeles, Calif.: N.A.T.A. Almanac (1986). .

Films
 Soviet Subversion of the Free Press: A Conversation with Yuri Bezmenov. Interview by G. Edward Griffin. Westlake Village, Calif.: American Media (1984). .

Audio
 Soviet Ideological Subversion of America in Four Stages: Elizabeth Clare Prophet interviews Tomas Schuman, Novosti Press, Soviet Defector. Malibu, Calif.: Summit University (1984). Incl. 3 audiocassettes, handouts. . "The flame of freedom speaks at Summit University forum."

See also
 List of KGB defectors
 List of Soviet and Eastern Bloc defectors

Notes

References

Further reading
 

Freedom of Information CIA file with article summarizing Bezmenov's ideas

1939 births
1993 deaths
People from Mytishchi
Conservatism in Canada
Right-wing politics in Canada
Critics of atheism
Soviet defectors
Activities of foreign intelligence agencies in India
Russian anti-communists
20th-century Russian journalists
Anti-Masonry
Russian expatriates in India